Charles Thomas Ireland Jr. (1921-1972) was a president of CBS, whose appointment from another company and then death caused turmoil within the corporation.

Career
Educated at Bowdoin College and then Yale Law School, Ireland had worked at the ITT Corporation before he was appointed CBS president in 1971, making him third in power to Frank Stanton and William S. Paley.  His appointment, which made him the likely successor to Stanton in the long run, caused turmoil at CBS since he came from outside the company and was placed ahead of several internal candidates.  Shockingly, in 1972, Ireland died of a heart attack less than a year after his appointment and was succeeded by Arthur Taylor who held the job for another four years.

Captain in the US Marines during World War II
President of Alleghany Corporation
Secretary of New York Central Railroad
Vice president of ITT Corporation
New England tennis champion
Father to Claire (deceased), Ann, stepfather to Alan Ireland (Gardner) and Stephen Gardner

References

External links
 "Executives: CBS's Overnight Star". Time. July 24, 1972.
 "New Face on the Tube". Time. September 20, 1971.

1921 births
1972 deaths
American television executives
American entertainment industry businesspeople
Bowdoin College alumni
CBS executives
Presidents of CBS, Inc.
20th-century American businesspeople
United States Marine Corps personnel of World War II